HaAderet v'HaEmunah ('The Glory and the Faith'), commonly referred to as LeChai Olamim, is a piyyut, or Jewish liturgical poem, sung or recited during Shacharit of Yom Kippur in virtually all Ashkenazic communities, and on Shabbat mornings in Chassidic communities.

Origin
The source of this piyyut is originally found in Hekhalot Rabbati ("Greater Palaces"), a mystical text dating from the sixth century which describes the spiritual ascent of Rabbi Ishmael ben Elisha. In Hekhalot Rabbati, it is said that Rabbi Ishmael heard the singing of angels and wrote this hymn as he had heard it. The 10th-century paytan Meshullam ben Kalonymos versified the piyyut, adapting it for the Yom Kippur liturgy.

Form and content
HaAderet v'HaEmunah is written in the form of an alphabetical acrostic, as is common in the Hebrew Bible and subsequent pieces of Jewish liturgy. Each line lists two divine attributes which begin with the same letter, and then ends with the phrase lechai olamim ("[He] who lives forever").

Use in prayer
In the Ashkenazic rite, this piyyut is recited prior to the kedusha in shacharit of Yom Kippur; in fact, the Magen Avraham quotes from the Maharil that it is inappropriate to recite this holy piyyut publicly at any time other than Yom Kippur. In Nusach Sefard and Nusach Ari, it is also recited weekly as a part of Shabbat morning prayers, during Pesukei dezimra, as well as on Yom Tov; however, many who follow Nusach Sefard recite it silently out of deference to the Magen Avraham and the Maharil.

HaAderet v'HaEmunah is also sung in hakafot during Simchat Torah in many communities.

Melodies

Chabad
In Chabad there are several tunes to the words of this piyyut:
 The earliest tune to this piyyut associated with Chabad is that of La Marseillaise, the French national anthem. During one of the Rebbe's farbrengens, when addressing a French audience in 1974, HaAderet v'HaEmunah was sung to that tune. In 1995, the tune appeared on the album "The Rebbe's Nigunim" by Avi Piamenta.
 One melody is attributed to Reb Shlomo der Geller, of Nevel, Russia, and has been added to the Sefer Hanigunim book published by Kehot Publication Society. It was released in the 1966 on the album Chabad Nigunim Vol. 6, performed by the Chabad Choir under the direction of Yosef Marton, with Abraham Lider as soloist. 
 One tune has been performed under the name "Uncle Dodi", which is on the album Tzamah 4 by Kobi Aflalo and Tzamah, a Chabad-affiliated musical collaboration. It has also been performed by Benny Friedman, as well as by Doron Twister.

Other
The Hasidic courts of Boyan and Toldos Aharon also have unique melodies for HaAderet v'HaEmunah.

Other instances
A line from this piyyut was adapted as the title of a journal published by Yosef Yitzchak Schneersohn in 1940, Hakeri'ah vehakedusha ("The Declaration and the Holiness").

See also
 Well-known piyyutim
 Jewish services
 Machzor

References

Jewish prayer and ritual texts
Hebrew words and phrases in Jewish prayers and blessings
Shacharit
Siddur of Orthodox Judaism
Jewish liturgical poems
Yom Kippur